Gianni Motta (born 13 March 1943) is an Italian former bicycle racer who won the 1966 Giro d'Italia.

Gianni Motta was born at Cassano d'Adda (Lombardy). His main victories include the Giro d'Italia (1966), a Giro di Lombardia (1964), a Tour de Suisse (1967) and two Tour de Romandie (1966, 1971).

Like many before him, he turned to manufacture and sales of bicycles after his racing career.

Major results
Sources:

1964
 1st Giro di Lombardia
 1st Coppa Bernocchi
 1st Trofeo Baracchi
 1st Stage 3b Tour de Romandie
 5th Overall Giro d'Italia
1st Stage 21
 2nd Giro dell'Appennino
 2nd Giro delle Tre Provincie
 3rd Giro del Veneto
 8th Coppa Placci
1965
 1st Tre Valli Varesine
 1st Stage 2 Grand Prix du Midi Libre
 2nd GP Lugano
 3rd Overall Tour de France
 3rd Giro di Campania
 3rd Milano-Vignola
 4th Coppa Bernocchi
 5th Giro di Lombardia
 8th Overall Paris–Nice
 9th Milan–San Remo
1966
 1st  Overall Giro d'Italia
1st  Points classification
1st Stages 17 & 19
 1st  Overall Tour de Romandie
1st Stage 2
 1st  Overall (TTT) Cronostaffetta
1st Stage 1b
 1st Giro di Romagna
 1st Tre Valli Varesine
 3rd Gran Piemonte
1967
 1st  Overall Tour de Suisse
1st Stages 2 & 3
 1st  Overall (TTT) Cronostaffetta
1st Stage 1b
 1st Milano–Torino
 1st Tre Valli Varesine
 1st Stage 4 Tour de Romandie
 2nd Milan–San Remo
 4th Road race, UCI Road World Championships
 6th Overall Giro di Sardegna
 6th Overall Giro d'Italia
 9th GP Alghero
1968
 1st  Overall (TTT) Cronostaffetta
 1st Giro dell'Appennino
 1st Giro dell'Emilia
 1st Stage 4 Tour de Romandie
 4th Giro di Toscana
  6th Overall  Giro d'Italia
1st Stage 8
 7th Zuri Metzgete
1969
 1st  Overall Escalada a Montjuïc
1st Stage 1b
 1st Giro dell'Emilia
 2nd Giro di Romagna
 5th Zuri Metzgete
1970
 1st  Overall (TTT) Cronostaffetta
1st Stage 1c
 1st Giro dell'Appennino
 1st Tre Valli Varesine
 1st Giro dell'Umbria
 1st Stage 1a Escalada a Montjuïch
 2nd Col San Martino
 3rd Overall À travers Lausanne
 3rd Giro di Lombardia
 10th Giro dell'Emilia
1971
 1st  Overall Tour de Romandie
1st Stages 4 & 5a
 1st Giro dell'Emilia
 1st Col San Martino
 2nd Gran Piemonte
 4th Overall Giro di Sardegna
 6th Trofeo Laigueglia
 7th Overall Tirreno–Adriatico
1st Stage 1
 7th Milan–San Remo
 10th La Flèche Wallonne
1972
 1st Stage 2 Giro d'Italia
 2nd  Milan–San Remo
 3rd Milano–Torino
 4th Giro di Puglia
 8th Overall Tour de Romandie
1973
 1st Stage 1 Monte Campione
 2nd Giro dell'Appennino
 3rd Milano-Vignola
 6th Giro dell'Emilia
 7th Coppa Placci
 10th Overall Giro d'Italia
1st Stage 6 
1974
 1st Stage 5 Giro di Puglia
1976
 9th Milano-Vignola

Grand Tour general classification results timeline

References

External links
 
 

1943 births
Living people
People from Cassano d'Adda
Italian male cyclists
Giro d'Italia winners
Italian Giro d'Italia stage winners
Tour de Suisse stage winners
Cyclists from the Metropolitan City of Milan